{{Infobox software
| name                   = NeoPaint
| logo                   = Nphd.png
| screenshot             = Neowin.PNG
| caption                = NeoPaint for Windows
| developer              = OSCS Software Development, Inc.(1991-1993)NeoSoft Corp (1993 - 2018)SinLios Soluciones Digitales S.L. (2018 - present)
| released               = 
| latest release version = 5.3.0
| latest release date    = 
| latest preview version = 
| latest preview date    = 
| programming language   = 
| operating_system       = MS-DOS,<ref>Subject: Kites & Computers (translation of a DRAma article), Date: Mon, 16 May 1994 06:07:01 -1000, From: Simo Salanne, ...3. Graphics design...then import the sail 
layout into a paint program like Neopaint II...NeoPaint - Version 2.0...OSCS Software Development, Inc...Bend, OR 97701-4631 U.S.A. NeoPaint $45 + $21 (shipping and handling)</ref> Microsoft Windows
| platform               = 
| language               = English
| genre                  = Raster graphics editor
| license                = Proprietary software
| website                = 
| size = 10MB
}}
NeoPaint is a raster graphics editor for Windows and MS-DOS. It supports several file formats including JPEG, GIF, BMP, PNG, and TIFF. The developer, NeoSoft, advertises NeoPaint as "being simple enough for use by children while remaining powerful enough for the purposes of advanced image editing"''.

The first version, NeoPaint 1.0, was released in 1992 on floppy disks. It supported video modes ranging from 640x350 to 1024x768 and multiple fonts. 

NeoPaint 2.2 came out for MS-DOS 3.1 in 1993, with support of for 2, 16, or 256 color images in Hercules, EGA, VGA, and Super VGA modes. 

NeoPaint 3.1 was released in 1995 supporting 24-bit images and formats like PCX, TIFF and BMP. NeoPaint 3.2 was released in 1996. An updated version, NeoPaint 3.2a, supported the GIF file format. NeoPaint 3.2d was released in 1998.

A Windows 95 version named NeoPaint for Windows v4.0 was released in 1999 supporting the PNG file format. 

On September 1, 2018 the program was rebranded as PixelNEO, becoming one of the VisualNEO software products. Formats such as JPEG 2000, ICO, CUR, PSD and RAW are supported.

References

External links
 PixelNEO

1992 software
Raster graphics editors
Graphics software
Graphics
Windows graphics-related software
DOS software